Cedarlawn Cemetery is a cemetery located in Philadelphia, Mississippi. It is also sometimes spelled Cedar Lawn Cemetery. Multiple people of note are interred at Cedarlawn Cemetery:
 Adam M. Byrd (1859–1912), US Congressman
 Florence Mars (1923–2006), Author
 Bubba Phillips (1928–1993), MLB player
 W. Arthur Winstead (1904–1995), US Congressman

References

External links
 
 Political Graveyard 
 

Cemeteries in Mississippi
Philadelphia, Mississippi